The Calcaire de Rognac is a geologic formation in France. It preserves fossils dating back to the Maastrichtian stage of the Late Cretaceous period and possibly also sometime during the Tertiary period. It is overlain by the Argiles et Grès à Reptiles Formation.

See also

 List of fossiliferous stratigraphic units in France

References
 

Cretaceous France